The Harlan's Holiday Stakes is a Grade III American Thoroughbred horse race open for three years old or older, over a distance of  miles on the dirt track held annually in December at Gulfstream Park, Hallandale Beach, Florida.  The event currently carries a purse of $100,000.

History 

The race was inaugurated in 2011  and named after the winning horse Harlan's Holiday who won 9 races in his career including the Grade I Florida Derby and Grade I Donn Handicap.

The event has been run at the  miles distance since its inception.

The event was upgraded to a Grade III event in 2005.

Records
Speed record: 
1:41.73 - River Seven (2013)

Margins: 
  lengths – Trickmeister (2011)

Most wins by a jockey
 4 - Luis Saez (2012, 2018, 2020, 2021)
 
Most wins by a trainer
 3 - Todd A. Pletcher (2014, 2016, 2021)

Most wins by an owner
 No owner has won the event more than once

Winners

See also
List of American and Canadian Graded races

References

Graded stakes races in the United States
2011 establishments in Florida
Recurring sporting events established in 2011
Horse races in Florida
Grade 3 stakes races in the United States